Stoddard County is a county located in the southeastern portion of the U.S. state of Missouri. As of the 2020 census, the population was 28,672. The county seat is Bloomfield. The county was officially organized on January 2, 1835, and is named for Amos Stoddard, the first American commandant (an early term for "governor") of Upper Louisiana.

Geography

Adjacent counties
Bollinger County (north)
Cape Girardeau County (northeast)
Scott County (northeast)
New Madrid County (southeast)
Dunklin County (south)
Butler County (southwest)
Wayne County (northwest)

Major highways
 Future Interstate 57
 U.S. Route 60
 Route 25
 Route 51
 Route 153

National protected area
Mingo National Wildlife Refuge (part)

Demographics

As of the census of 2000, there 29,705 people, 12,064 households, and 8,480 families residing in the county. The population density was 36 people per square mile (14/km2). There were 13,221 housing units at an average density of 16 per square mile (6/km2). The racial makeup of the county was 97.34% White, 0.91% Black or African American, 0.40% Native American, 0.09% Asian, 0.01% Pacific Islander, 0.24% from other races, and 1.01% from two or more races. Approximately 0.78% of the population were Hispanic or Latino of any race. 38.4% were of American, 15.4% German, 12.4% Irish and 8.5% English ancestry.

There were 12,064 households, out of which 30.50% had children under the age of 18 living with them, 57.40% were married couples living together, 9.40% had a female householder with no husband present, and 29.70% were non-families. 26.60% of all households were made up of individuals, and 13.70% had someone living alone who was 65 years of age or older. The average household size was 2.39 and the average family size was 2.88.

In the county, the population was spread out, with 23.90% under the age of 18, 8.50% from 18 to 24, 26.30% from 25 to 44, 24.10% from 45 to 64, and 17.20% who were 65 years of age or older. The median age was 39 years. For every 100 females there were 92.60 males. For every 100 females age 18 and over, there were 88.20 males.

The median income for a household in the county was $33,120, and the median income for a family was $41,072. Males had a median income of $26,514 versus $17,778 for females. The per capita income for the county was $18,003. About 12.80% of families and 16.50% of the population were below the poverty line, including 20.20% of those under age 18 and 17.60% of those age 65 or over.

Religion
According to the Association of Religion Data Archives County Membership Report (2000), Stoddard County is a part of the Bible Belt with evangelical Protestantism being the majority religion. The most predominant denominations among residents in Stoddard County who adhere to a religion are Southern Baptists (41.4%), Methodists (12.9%), and Pentecostal (8.3%).

2020 Census

Politics

Local
The Republican Party predominately controls politics at the local level in Stoddard County. Republicans hold ten of the elected positions in the county. In the 2016 election, Sheriff Carl Hefner, who originally ran as a Democrat, switched parties and ran as a Republican.

State
Stoddard County is divided among three legislative districts in the Missouri House of Representatives.

District 159 – Currently represented by Herman Morse (R-Dexter) and consists of most of the county, including Advance, Bell City, Bloomfield, Dexter, Dudley, and Puxico.

District 161 – Currently represented by Steve Hodges (D-East Prairie) and consists of some of the southeastern portions of the county along the New Madrid County border including Baker, Essex, and Penermon. 

District 163 – Currently represented by Kent Hampton (R-Malden) and consists of the southwestern corner along the Dunklin and Butler county lines, including Bernie. Democratic incumbent Tom Todd was defeated by Republican challenger Kent Hampton in 2010.

All of Stoddard County is a part of Missouri's 25th District in the Missouri Senate and is currently represented by State Senator Rob Mayer (R-Dexter). In 2008, Mayer defeated Democrat M. Shane Stoelting 65.32%-34.68% in the district. The 25th Senatorial District consists of Butler, Dunklin, New Madrid, Pemiscot, Ripley, Stoddard, and Wayne counties.

Federal
Stoddard County is included in Missouri's 8th Congressional District and is currently represented by Jason T. Smith (R-Salem) in the U.S. House of Representatives. Smith won a special election on Tuesday, June 4, 2013, to finish out the remaining term of U.S. Representative Jo Ann Emerson (R-Cape Girardeau). Emerson announced her resignation a month after being reelected with over 70 percent of the vote in the district. She resigned to become CEO of the National Rural Electric Cooperative.

Political culture

At the presidential level, Stoddard County generally tends to lean Republican. John McCain carried Stoddard County over Barack Obama by more than a two-to-one margin in 2008. George W. Bush also carried Stoddard County twice in 2000 over Al Gore and in 2004 over John Kerry when he received just under 70 percent of the vote. Bill Clinton did manage to carry Stoddard County in 1992 but narrowly lost it in his reelection bid in 1996 to Bob Dole.

Like most rural areas, voters in Stoddard County generally adhere to socially and culturally conservative principles which strongly influence their Republican leanings. In 2004, Missourians voted on a constitutional amendment to define marriage as the union between a man and a woman—it overwhelmingly passed Stoddard County with 88.29 percent of the vote. The initiative passed the state with 71 percent of support from voters as Missouri became the first state to ban same-sex marriage. In 2006, Missourians voted on a constitutional amendment to fund and legalize embryonic stem cell research in the state—it failed in Stoddard County with 60.65 percent voting against the measure. The initiative narrowly passed the state with 51 percent of support from voters as Missouri became one of the first states in the nation to approve embryonic stem cell research. Despite Stoddard County's longstanding tradition of supporting socially conservative platforms, voters in the county have a penchant for advancing populist causes like increasing the minimum wage. In 2006, Missourians voted on a proposition (Proposition B) to increase the minimum wage in the state to $6.50 an hour—it passed Stoddard County with 72.02 percent of the vote. The proposition strongly passed every single county in Missouri with 75.94 percent voting in favor as the minimum wage was increased to $6.50 an hour in the state. During the same election, voters in five other states also strongly approved increases in the minimum wage.

Missouri presidential preference primary (2008)

In the 2008 presidential primary, voters in Stoddard County from both political parties supported candidates who finished in second place in the state at large and nationally.

Former U.S. Senator Hillary Clinton (D-New York) received more votes, a total of 2,225, than any candidate from either party in Stoddard County during the 2008 presidential primaries.

Education

Public schools
Advance R-IV School District - Advance
Advance Elementary School (K-06)
Advance High School (07-12)
Bell City R-II School District - Bell City
Bell City Elementary School (K-06)
Bell City High School (07-12)
Bernie R-XIII School District - Bernie
Bernie Elementary School (PK-06)
Bernie High School (07-12)
Bloomfield R-XIV School District - Bloomfield
Bloomfield Elementary School (PK-05)
Bloomfield Middle School (06-08)
Bloomfield High School (09-12)
Bloomfield Juvenile Center (03-12)
Dexter R-XI School District - Dexter
Southwest Elementary School (PK-02)
Central Elementary School (03-05)
T.S. Hill Middle School (06-08)
Dexter High School (09-12)
Puxico R-VIII School District - Puxico
Puxico Elementary School (PK-05)
Puxico Jr. High School (06-08)
Puxico High School (09-12)
Mingo Technical High School (12)
Richland R-I School District - Essex
Richland Elementary School (K-06)
Richland High School (07-12)

Public libraries
Advance Community Library  
Bernie Public Library  
 Bloomfield Public Library  
Keller Public Library  
 Puxico Public Library

Communities

Cities

Advance
Bell City
Bernie
Bloomfield (county seat)
Dexter
Dudley
Essex
Puxico

Villages
Baker
Penermon

Census-designated place
Grayridge

Unincorporated communities

Acorn Ridge
Aid
Aquilla
Ardeola
Asherville
Avert
Brownwood
Buffington
Bunker Hill
 Charter Oak
Cobb
Curdton
Cyrus
Durnell
Frisco
Guam
Heagy
Hunterville
Idalia
Idlewild
Ives
Kinder
LaValle
Leora
Marco
Maulsby
Messler
Mingo
Painton
Powe
Pyletown
Redd
Shawan
Shreve
Stoddard
Swinton
Tillman
Toga
Toppertown
Zadock

See also
National Register of Historic Places listings in Stoddard County, Missouri

References

External links
 Digitized 1930 Plat Book of Stoddard County  from University of Missouri Division of Special Collections, Archives, and Rare Books

  

 
1835 establishments in Missouri
Populated places established in 1835